Mario Humberto Osuna Pereznúñez (born 20 August 1988), also known as El Mono, is a Mexican professional footballer who plays as a midfielder for Liga MX club Juárez.

Club career
Osuna began his career with local team Sinaloa, debuting when he was aged 20 and after a few months he became an undisputed starter for the Dorados.
In the fall of 2012, his team reached the final of the Ascenso MX, the Mexican Segunda Division, and won the Copa MX, becoming the first ever Segunda Division club to win the competition.
After four years, thanks to his good performances, he was bought at the end of the year by Querétaro quickly becoming a regular starter. He made his debut for the Gallos Blancos on 5 January 2013 on a 2–2 draw against León and scored his first goal on 19 July on a 1–3 loss against Morelia.

International career
In April 2015, Osuna received his first call-up to the senior national team (managed by Miguel Herrera) for a friendly game against the United States, where he made his debut.

Career statistics

International

Honours
Querétaro
Copa MX: Apertura 2016

References

External links
 
 
 
 
 
 

1988 births
Living people
Dorados de Sinaloa footballers
Footballers from Sinaloa
Sportspeople from Culiacán
Association football midfielders
Liga MX players
Querétaro F.C. footballers
Atlético Morelia players
Mexico international footballers
2015 Copa América players
Mexican footballers
21st-century Mexican people